The Minnesota Review is a literary magazine covering literary and cultural studies which places a special emphasis on politically engaged criticism, fiction, and poetry. Issues are often "themed," recent issues examining the nature of academic publishing, of academic celebrity, and of "smart" working class kids' experiences as adults or children within the educational system. The Minnesota Review is currently based at Virginia Tech in Blacksburg, Virginia, and edited by the MFA program. The journal is published by Duke University Press.

History
The Minnesota Review was established in 1960 in Minnesota. Some of the early editors were from Macalester College, but early issues have a disclaimer against affiliation with any university. The magazine was oriented toward publishing avant garde fiction, poetry, and graphic work. From 1982, edited by Fred Pfeil and Michael Sprinker, it began to acquire the Marxist overtones and emphasis on literary theory for which it would later be known. Under the editorship of Jeffrey Williams, it moved from explicit Marxism toward politically conscious cultural studies.

Editors
The following persons have been editor-in-chief of the magazine:

See also
List of literary magazines

External links
 
 The Minnesota Review at Duke Journals Online
 The Minnesota Review Blog

Biannual magazines published in the United States
Duke University Press academic journals
English-language magazines
Literary magazines published in the United States
Magazines established in 1960
Magazines published in Minnesota
Mass media in Durham, North Carolina
Magazines published in North Carolina